Daniel Raischl (born 19 March 1997) is a German professional footballer who plays as a defender for Austrian club SAK 1914.

External links

 

Living people
1997 births
German footballers
Association football defenders
2. Liga (Austria) players
FC Liefering players
Floridsdorfer AC players
ATSV Stadl-Paura players
German expatriate footballers
German expatriate sportspeople in Austria
Expatriate footballers in Austria